The Greater Sudbury Cubs are a Junior "A" ice hockey team from Rayside-Balfour, Ontario, Canada. They are a part of the Northern Ontario Junior Hockey League (NOJHL).

History
The Sudbury Northern Wolves came into the league in 2000 and were present up until they announced an affiliation agreement with the Ontario Hockey League's Sudbury Wolves midway through the 2005–06 season. The Sudbury Northern Wolves were then re-branded as the Sudbury Jr. Wolves. The team went on to break league records that season. In their first season, the Jr. Wolves won the NOJHL championship over their rivals North Bay Skyhawks. The Jr. Wolves came one goal short of qualifying for the Royal Bank Cup losing to the Fort William North Stars 7–6 in overtime scored by former Sudbury Northern Wolves player, Josh Slobodian.

The Sudbury Jr. Wolves would lose the NOJHL finals to the Soo Indians at the conclusion of the 2006–07 season. The following season, the Jr. Wolves defeated the Abitibi Eskimos and moved on to the Dudley Hewitt Cup in Newmarket, but came back winless. The Sudbury Jr. Wolves last taste of success came in 2010–11 when they went to the NOJHL finals, but lost to the Soo Eagles.

In the summer of 2011, the Jr. Wolves broke their ties with the Sudbury Wolves and elected to change their name to the Cubs. In 2012, the Cubs were sold and changed their name to the Sudbury Nickel Barons and were later awarded hosting duties for the Dudley Hewitt Cup, but they pulled out and the tournament was awarded to North Bay instead.

In spring 2015, the Nickel Barons relocated to Rayside-Balfour and became the Rayside-Balfour Canadians and at the same time pulled out of hosting the 2016 Dudley Hewitt Cup, in which it was allocated to Kirkland Lake. The team was sold to local player agent Adrian Gedye over the spring of 2016.

On August 2, 2016, defenceman Sam Oden died in a car accident in Edina, Minnesota.  After the team received the news of Oden's passing, they promptly and permanently retired his jersey number 4.

In the 2017–18 regular season, the team won its first division title with 79 points.

On September 9, 2021, the team officially changed its name to the Greater Sudbury Cubs.

Season-by-season results

Retired numbers
4 — Sam Oden

References

External links
Official website

Northern Ontario Junior Hockey League teams
Sports teams in Greater Sudbury
Ice hockey clubs established in 2000
2000 establishments in Ontario